Sir Matthew Deane, 3rd Baronet (c. 1680 – 11 March 1747) was an Irish baronet and politician.

He was the son of Sir Robert Deane, 2nd Baronet of Muskerry and Springfield Castle, Co. Limerick by his wife Anne Brettridge, one of the three daughters and co-heiresses of Captain Roger Brettridge (1630-1683) of Castles Brettridge, Cope and Magner, Co. Cork and his wife Jane Hakby.  Another source has his wife as Anne Bettridge, daughter of Colonel William Bettridge. He succeeded to the baronetcy in 1712.

He served as High Sheriff of County Cork for 1714  and sat in the Irish House of Commons for Charleville from 1713 to 1715.  He was again a Member of Parliament (MP) for Cork County from 1728 until his death in 1747.

Deane married Jane Sharpe, only daughter of Reverend William Sharpe. They had three daughters and three sons. Deane was succeeded in the baronetcy by his oldest son Matthew. On the latter's death in 1751 the title devolved to the third son Robert.

References

1680s births
1747 deaths
Baronets in the Baronetage of Ireland
Irish MPs 1713–1714
Irish MPs 1727–1760
Members of the Parliament of Ireland (pre-1801) for County Cork constituencies
High Sheriffs of County Cork